Louis Lowenstein may refer to:

Louis Lowenstein (lawyer) (1925–2009), U.S. corporate attorney, law professor, and financial industry critic
Louis Lowenstein (medicine) (1908–1968), U.S.-Canadian medical researcher who made significant contributions in hematology and immunology